KMRX (96.1 FM, "Big 96.1") is a classic hits music formatted radio station located and licensed in El Dorado, Arkansas and serves North Louisiana and South Arkansas.  The station is owned and operated by Noalmark Broadcasting Corporation.

The station was assigned the KMRX call letters by the Federal Communications Commission on July 5, 2004.

When its call letters were KXZX, the station originally had a HAC format and was branded as "97X". When the call letters changed to KMRX, the station was rebranded as "Mix 96.1" and then "Power 96.1". The station aired The Kidd Kraddick Morning Show during this time. In 2017 when the station switched its format to classic hits and became "Big 96.1", the HAC format moved to KELD-FM which rebranded as "106.5 the Planet".

KMRX is managed by Patrick Nolan.

References

External links

MRX
Classic hits radio stations in the United States
Noalmark Broadcasting Corporation radio stations
El Dorado, Arkansas